Star TV may refer to:

 E! (Canadian TV channel) (formerly Star!), a Canadian entertainment news channel
 Las Estrellas (Spanish for The Stars), the Mexican television network
 Estrella TV (Spanish for Star TV), the American Spanish-language network
 Star, an international television and streaming brand owned by Disney Media and Entertainment Distribution
 Disney Networks Group Asia Pacific, a Hong Kong-based commercial broadcasting company, the original incarnation of the brand under its previous name Star TV
 Star (Disney+), a general entertainment hub within Disney+ available in some countries where Disney+ is operated
 Star+, a streaming service in Latin America owned by Disney
 Star Channel (Latin American TV channel), a Latin American television network by Disney formerly known as Fox (1993–2018) and Fox Channel (2018–2021)
 Disney Star (formerly known as Star India), previously a part of Star in Hong Kong, now a distinct division owned by Disney
 Star China Media, a media group in Mainland China, previously part of this group but now owned by China Media Capital
 Star Channel, former name of The Movie Channel, an American premium cable and satellite television network
 Star Channel (Greece), a Greek television network
 Star Channel (Japan), a Japanese group of premium television channels
 Star Cinema, a Filipino film and television production company and distributor
 Star Television Network, a short-lived American television network based in Orlando, Florida
 Startv, a Canadian weekly entertainment television program
 Star TV (Australia), a former television network in Queensland
 Star TV (Tanzania), a television station in Tanzania
 Star TV (Turkey), a general entertainment channel in Turkey
 Zvezda (TV channel) (Russian for Star), a military-themed Russian television channel owned by the Russian Ministry of Defense

See also

Start (streaming service), a Russian streaming service
Start TV, an American free-to-air television network 
Starz, an American premium cable and satellite television network
Starz Encore, its sister channel
StarHub TV, a cable television operator in Singapore